"Minnie's Yoo Hoo" is a song introduced in the 1929 Mickey Mouse cartoon Mickey's Follies. The song was composed by Walt Disney and Carl Stalling. It was the first  Disney song to be released on sheet music.

The song, sung by Mickey Mouse, praises his girlfriend Minnie, accompanied by other animals. In Mickey's Follies, Mickey's singing voice was provided by an unknown studio employee; in the early days, Walt Disney was not yet the exclusive voice for Mickey.

An instrumental version was used as the opening theme song for all of the Mickey Mouse cartoons from The Jazz Fool (1929) to Mickey's Steam Roller (1934), and was also used as the theme song of the original 1930s Mickey Mouse Clubs in theaters. The song has been popular on records.

It was played over the credits to Disney's 1972 television series The Mouse Factory, and was also used as the theme song of Don Ramón in El Chavo del Ocho and sketch of Chómpiras in Los Caquitos.

References

External links 
 
 

Disney songs
1929 songs
Songs written for animated films
Songs about fictional female characters
Mickey Mouse
Animated series theme songs